

Daniel Martin Diaz is an American artist and musician based in Tucson, Arizona. His work has been exhibited worldwide and has been published in LA Times, NY Times, Juxtapoz, High Fructose, and Low Rider Magazine as well as in five books dedicated to his artwork. Diaz has designed artwork for large public art projects in the US and has won many awards such as a gold and platinum record designed for Atlantic Records. He is also involved in various musical projects.

The band P.O.D. commissioned Diaz to design and paint the cover of their self-titled album Payable on Death. The album went gold in four weeks and caused a controversy across the country due to the cover artwork Diaz created. In 2010, he designed and painted the cover of Good Charlotte's album, Cardiology.

Influences
Diaz's influences include an eclectic mix from fantastical Mexican Retablos, mystical votive offerings, the Early Netherlandish painters, Gothic ornamentation, arcane religious sigils and medallions, alchemy, as well as symbolism culled from assorted secret societies such as The Rosicrucians.

Symbolism
Symbolism plays a central role in Diaz’s art. It harks back to an earlier Christian culture where a mostly illiterate populace could read the paths leading to the world of the Spirit in the figures, colors, symbols, and gestures of the sculptures, paintings, and mosaics that adorned the portals, walls, and altar screens of the churches. Like his predecessors, he provides an artistic shorthand—one uniquely his—to bring his viewers to an inner, higher world.

Artist statement
"One of my earliest memories as a child was the way death and religion played an important role in my family’s life. My parents were born in Mexico with traditional beliefs, and their beliefs made their way into my subconscious. The fact that many of those beliefs seemed to render no logical explanation has also influenced me. These unanswered questions find a home in my work, which evokes the mystery, fear and irony of those vivid memories of my past. I do not claim to understand these questions. I just paint and let them reveal themselves to me." - Daniel Martin Diaz

Music
Diaz is a primary member of the bands Blind Divine (with singer Paula Catherine Valencia); Crystal Radio (with singer Amelia Poe) and Trees Speak.

Published works 

 Triginta Uno Dies: Thirty-One Drawings, Thirty-One Days. Los Angeles, California: La Luz de Jesus Press, 2004 
 Mysterium Fidei. Los Angeles, California: La Luz de Jesus Press, 2007 
 Anatomy of Sorrow. Los Angeles, California: La Luz de Jesus Press, 2011 
 Soul of Science. Tucson, Arizona: Mysticus Publishing, 2013 
 Soul Machine. Los Angeles, California: La Luz de Jesus Press, 2018

References

External links
 http://www.danielmartindiaz.com/ - Official website
 http://www.blinddivine.com/ - Blind Divine
 https://web.archive.org/web/20070613144344/http://beinart.org/artists/daniel-martin-diaz/ - Daniel Martin Diaz - Surreal Art Collective

20th-century American painters
American male painters
21st-century American painters
Artists from Tucson, Arizona
1967 births
Living people
Fantastic art
American artists of Mexican descent
20th-century American male artists